This is a list of Canadian Academy Award winners and nominees. This list details the performances of Canadian filmmakers, actors, actresses and films that have either been submitted, nominated or have won an Academy Award.

Best Actor in a Leading Role

Best Actress in a Leading Role

Best Actor in a Supporting Role

Best Actress in a Supporting Role

Best Animated Feature

Best Animated Short Film

Best Cinematography

Best Costume Design

Best Director

Best Documentary Feature

Best Documentary Short Film

Best Film Editing

Best International Feature Film

Best Live Action Short Film

Best Picture

Best Makeup and Hairstyling

Best Original Song

Best Original Score

Best Production Design

Best Sound

Best Visual Effects

Best Writing (Adapted Screenplay)

Best Writing (Original Screenplay)

Special Awards

Nominations and Winners

See also

 Cinema of Canada
 List of Canadian films
 Genie Awards

Notes

References

External links
A brief history of Canadian actors at the Oscars, Peter Knegt, CBC Arts

Lists of Academy Award winners and nominees by nationality or region
Academy Awards
Academy Award winners and nominees